Levon Helm is a 1982 album by Levon Helm. It was his second eponymous album and his last studio album until Dirt Farmer, released in 2007.

Track list
"You Can't Win 'Em All" (Andy Bown, Tony Chapman)
"Lucrecia" (Richard Supa)
"Even a Fool Would Let Go" (Kerry Chater, Tom Snow)
"I've Got a Bet with Myself" (David Elliot)
"Money" (Janie Bradford, Berry Gordy)
"Get Out Your Big Roll Daddy" (Troy Seals, Roger Chapman)
"Willie and the Hand Jive" (Johnny Otis)
"The Got Song" (Tommy Talton)
"Give a Little Bit" (Talton)
"God Bless 'Em All" (Mickey Buckins)
"Summertime Blues" (Eddie Cochran) (2005 bonus track on European LP and US CD)

Personnel
Levon Helm – vocals, drums, percussion, mandolin
Duncan Cameron, Earl Cate, Jimmy Johnson, Pete Carr, Wayne Perkins – guitar
David Hood – bass guitar
Barry Beckett, Ernest Cate, Steve Nathan – keyboards
Mickey Buckins, Owen Hale, Roger Hawkins – drums, percussion
Harvey Thompson, Robert Harwell – tenor saxophone
Ronald Eades – baritone saxophone
Ben Cauley, Harrison Calloway – trumpet
Charles Rose – trombone
Jimmy "Doc" Simpson – clarinet
Ava Aldridge, Bonnie Bramlett, Lenny LeBlanc, Mac McAnally, Richard Supa, Robert Byrne, Ron Eoff, Russell Smith, Terry Cagle, Wayne Perkins, Will McFarlane – vocals

References

1982 albums
Levon Helm albums
Albums produced by Barry Beckett
Capitol Records albums